Indalasa (Binukid: Indalasà) is a rural barangay of Malaybalay, Philippines. It is located east of the city in the Upper Pulangi District. According to the 2015 census, it has a population of 1,690 people.

Profile 
Indalasa is bordered to the north by Zamboanguita, to the east by the Municipality of Loreto, Agusan del Sur, to the south by barangay Canangaan of Cabanglasan, Bukidnon, and to the west by barangay Silae and Mapulo. The Pantaron Range straddles its eastern boundary with Agusan del Sur and its western boundary is formed by the Pulangi River. The village proper is on the northwest corner of the barangay near Mapulo. Sitio Lupuklupuk is on a valley on the central part of the barangay, Sitio Mindagulus to the north, and Sitio Umayam to the extreme east, along the headwaters of the Umayam River. Agriculture is the principal economic activity, where corn and rice are the major products. Most of the population are dumagat, a Binukid term for coastal peoples, usually Visayans. These people entered the barangay during the logging period in the 1960s and stayed after the moratorium on logging in the 1980s. Nevertheless, Indalasa is the only barangay in Malaybalay to have a significant Umayamnon community.

References 

Barangays of Bukidnon
Barangays of Malaybalay